The following Union Army units and commanders fought in the Battle of Piedmont of the American Civil War. The Confederate order of battle is listed separately.

Abbreviations used

Military rank
 MG = Major General
 BG = Brigadier General
 Col = Colonel
 Ltc = Lieutenant Colonel
 Maj = Major
 Cpt = Captain
 Lt = 1st Lieutenant

Army of the Shenandoah

Department of West Virginia
MG David Hunter

See also

 Virginia in the American Civil War

References
 Johnson, Robert Underswood & Clarence Clough Buell (eds.).  Battles and Leaders of the Civil War Volume 4 (New York:  The Century Company), 1884.
 Lepa, Jack H. The Shenandoah Valley Campaign of 1864 (Jefferson, NC:  McFarland & Co.), 2003.  
 Patchan, Scott C. Shenandoah Summer:  The 1864 Valley Campaign (Lincoln, NE:  University of Nebraska Press), 2007.  

American Civil War orders of battle